Pomponius Januarianus (fl. 3rd century) was an aristocrat who held a number of imperial appointments, most notably consul in AD 288.

Biography
Originally a member of the Equestrian order, Januarianus served as the Praefectus Aegypti from 282 to 284 under the emperor Numerian. He transferred his loyalty to the incoming emperor Diocletian, who rewarded him with advancement into high office. Sometime between 284 and 289, Januarianus was adlected into the Roman senate, and served as Praetorian prefect to Diocletian at some point.

In 288 Januarianus was granted the office of consul posterior as the colleague of the emperor Maximian. Either during his time as consul or immediately after his replacement by a suffect consul, he was appointed the Praefectus Urbi of Rome, a position he held from 27 February 288 until sometime in AD 289.

References

Sources
 
 
 

3rd-century Romans
3rd-century Roman governors of Egypt
Imperial Roman consuls
Late Roman Empire political office-holders
Roman governors of Egypt
Praetorian prefects
Urban prefects of Rome
Januarianus, Pomponius
Year of birth unknown
Year of death unknown